Spejbl and Hurvínek (/s-payble & hoor-vee-neck/) is a Czech puppet comedy duo. The characters were conceived by Czech puppeteer Josef Skupa. Throughout the years the two characters have gained international success.

They have released many comedy albums, had their own television show and feature film Harvie and the Magic Museum. Each album usually contains one story, about the dim-witted father Josef Spejbl, and his son Hurvínek, who live with another family in the same apartment. Later on, the duo was accompanied by another family, Ms. Kateřina and her daughter Mánička. All four live with the dog Žeryk who has the ability to bark words. Though the comedy is aimed at children, there are several inside jokes that are meant for adults. The duo has their own Spejbl and Hurvínek Theatre in Prague-Dejvice. Besides puppet performances, several stories of Spejbl and Hurvínek were recorded, and one series of Večerníček (bedtime stories).

History
The first of the puppets, invented by Josef Skupa in 1920, was Spejbl – a retrograde teacher, barely able to keep up with things happening around him. Skupa then performed with him in cabarets in Western Bohemia. In 1926, he brought to life his son, Hurvínek – a sometimes lazy, sometimes hyper-active, child. By that time Skupa had mastered performing with both of them, even providing voices for them, using his typical high-pitch voice for Hurvínek.

The success Skupa had with both of the puppets was enough for him to establish a theatre dedicated to them, in 1930. Skupa handed over the puppeteering to other people in the theatre, and concentrated on providing voices and writing new plots for the two of them. The two characters have entertained both children and adults for decades. Later on, Ms. Kateřina and Mánička, along with Žeryk were introduced, making it more plausible for them to experience the most bizarre and entertaining adventures of all in their stories.

After Skupa's death, the next voice actor to voice the two puppets was Miloš Kirschner. Voices for Mánička and Ms. Kateřina were provided by his wife, Helena Štáchová. After Kirschner's death the next voice actor for Spejbl and Hurvínek became Martin Klásek.

External links

Marionette Spejbl

Czech comedians
Jiří Trnka
20th-century comedians